Q36 may refer to:
 Q36 (album), by The Rentals
 Q36 (New York City bus)
 
 Ya-Sin, the 36th surah of the Quran